Sainte-Agnès (Occitan: Sant Anha, Sant Anh, Santa Anhès or Santa Anh; Vivaro-Alpine: Santa Anha) is a commune in the Alpes-Maritimes department in the Provence-Alpes-Côte d'Azur region in Southeastern France. It is the highest village in the area, perched 800 metres above the level of the Mediterranean Sea. In 2018, Sainte-Agnès had a population of 1,341. It was included on the list of Les Plus Beaux Villages de France (The Most Beautiful Villages of France) in 1997.

History
The Fort Maginot de Sainte-Agnès, which was built as part of the Maginot Line in 1932, is now a museum. It was built to defend the area against possible Italian and German invasion. However, it was never used since the invaders went around it. Tourist can enter the fort which could house between 300 to 400 soldiers for up to three months. Tour schedules are irregular so tourists have to make sure to confirm before visiting.

Geography
The narrow road to the village provides views of Roquebrune-Cap-Martin, Menton and on to Italy. Visitors can get to Menton by train and take the bus (line 10) from the Gare Routière station to Sainte-Agnès. It is also possible to drive for 25 minutes along the scenic road. The village sits overlooking the city of Menton and the Mediterranean.

Demographics

See also
Communes of the Alpes-Maritimes department

References

Communes of Alpes-Maritimes
Plus Beaux Villages de France
Alpes-Maritimes communes articles needing translation from French Wikipedia